This is a list of members of the Western Australian Legislative Council from 22 May 1932 to 21 May 1934. The chamber had 30 seats made up of ten provinces each electing three members, on a system of rotation whereby one-third of the members would retire at each biennial election.

Notes
 On 15 September 1932, North-East Province Nationalist MLC Frederick Allsop died. Nationalist candidate Richard Moore won the resulting by-election on 29 October 1932.
 On 24 April 1933, Central Province Labor MLC John Drew was appointed Chief Secretary in the new Ministry led by Philip Collier. He was therefore required to resign and contest a ministerial by-election, at which he was returned unopposed on 2 May 1933.
 On 30 November 1933, South-West Province Nationalist MLC John Ewing died. Nationalist candidate Les Craig won the resulting by-election on 20 January 1934.
 On 13 February 1934, North-East Province Nationalist MLC Edgar Harris died. Nationalist candidate Charles Elliott won the resulting by-election on 17 March 1934.

Sources
 
 
 

Members of Western Australian parliaments by term